Kurien (also spelt Kurian) is a male given name and family name common amongst the traditional aristocratic Saint Thomas Christians and  Syrian Christians in Kerala, India.

It is a derivative of 'Kuriakose', believed to have originated from Saint Quiricus who is known as Saint Kuriakose in the Syriac liturgy.

Kurien (also spelled Kurian) is a Saint Thomas Christians and Syrian Christian name of Syriac Aramaic origin or Greek origin, presumed to have originated from the name Quriaqos (ܩܘܪܝܩܘܣ) or the Greek Kyrios or kurios meaning Lord, master, power or authority, and is very popular among Kerala Christians both as a first name and as a surname. The ancient Roman name 'Cyriacus' is considered the equivalent of the Greek 'Kyriakos' or the Syriac Aramaic name Quriaqos (ܩܘܪܝܩܘܣ) that means "Of the Lord".

Popular Syrian Christian variants of this name include Kuriakose, Cyriac and Kurian.

Notable Kurians
A. K. Antony, Indian politician and attorney who was the 23rd Defence Minister of India
 C. A. Kurian, CPI State Executive Committee
C.C. Kurian, Former Vice principal CMS College Kottayam, Former HOD Mathematics Saint Gits College of Engineering.
C.T. Kurien, a retired professor of economics
Diana Mariam Kurian, known as Nayanthara, an Indian movie actress
George Kurian, CEO of NetApp
Job Kurian Singer and music composer
Kurien Thomas, a Pentecostal missionary to Central India
Mar Dionysius III, who was born Kurien,

P. J. Kurien, an Indian politician, member of parliament, social worker and educationalist who is the Deputy Chairman of the Rajya Sabha
 P. V. Kurian, Indian social activist
Prema Kurien, a professor of sociology at the Syracuse University
Shruti Kurien-Kanetkar, an Indian badminton player
T. K. Kurien, executive vice chairman of Wipro Limited
 Thomas Kurian,  CEO Google Cloud and former President of Oracle Corporation
 V. J. Kurian IAS, Managing Director, Cochin International Airport Limited 
Verghese Kurien,  social entrepreneur

See also
Kurien
Saint Thomas Christian names
Syrian Christians

Masculine given names
Surnames of Indian origin
Indian surnames